A Plantation Act (1926) is an early Vitaphone sound-on-disc short film starring Al Jolson, the first film that Jolson starred in. Jolson in blackface sings three of his hit songs: "April Showers", "Rock-a-Bye Your Baby with a Dixie Melody", and "When the Red, Red Robin (Comes Bob, Bob, Bobbin' Along)". 

The film presents him as if in a live stage performance, complete with three curtain calls at the finish. Jolson is dressed as a plantation worker for the entirety of the short, but only performs his entrance in character. For the remainder of the film he speaks and performs to the audience as Al Jolson. The film features one set, that of a cabin with farmland behind it, and a cage with live chickens. Two fixed film cameras are used to give a wide shot and a medium shot of Jolson and the set.

Its premiere took place on October 7, 1926, at the Colony Theatre, New York, where it concluded a program of short subjects that accompanied Warner Brothers' second feature-length Vitaphone film The Better 'Ole. The "Intermission" card which appears at its end derives from that use. Critics praised A Plantation Act as the hit of the show.

The short was long believed to be a lost film, and its unavailability fueled the misconception that Jolson's first sound film was the famous feature-length milestone The Jazz Singer, which premiered almost exactly one year later. A mute print of A Plantation Act was eventually found in the Library of Congress, mislabeled as a preview for The Jazz Singer. A copy of the corresponding soundtrack disc also came to light, but it had been broken into four pieces and glued back together so imperfectly that it would not play through. After some careful surgery, restoration technicians succeeded in making a usable dub from the disc and digitally removing the pops and clicks resulting from the damage. The restored film was included on a LaserDisc published in the 1990s and as a bonus feature on the 2007 3-disc DVD release of The Jazz Singer.

See also

Vitaphone Varieties

References

External links
 
 
 
 

1920s musical films
1926 films
American black-and-white films
Blackface minstrel shows and films
Vitaphone short films
1920s rediscovered films
American musical films
Rediscovered American films
1920s English-language films
1920s American films